Frome by-election may refer to:

 1853 Frome by-election
 1854 Frome by-election
 1856 Frome by-election
 1876 Frome by-election